St. Paul's Cemetery  (also known as Saint Paul's Episcopal Church Cemetery) is a cemetery in Alexandria, Virginia. Established in 1809, it is the cemetery of St. Paul's Episcopal Church. It is located in the Wilkes Street cemetery complex.

Notable interments
 Thomas Childs (1796–1853), US Army general
 Montgomery Dent Corse (1816–1895), Confederate Army General and businessman
 Julius A. De Lagnel (1827–1912), Confederate Army general
 Wilmer McLean (1814–1882), owner of two significant Civil War sites in Virginia
 The Female Stranger (1793–1816), unknown woman died in Alexandria; significant for her grave marker inscription and legends about her ghost

References

External links
 

Cemeteries in Alexandria, Virginia
1809 establishments in Virginia